Atiahu is a village on the southeastern coast of the Indonesian island of Seram, just to the north of Bemu. Situated at the mouth of a river on Teluti Bay, Atiahu is a fishing village. The Bobot language is spoken in the vicinity.

References

Populated places in Seram Island